is a video game character created by SNK. He makes first appearance in the fighting game Fatal Fury: King of Fighters as the sub-boss from the game. In the Fatal Fury series Billy is the right-hand man from Geese Howard, the crime lord from Southtown. In one of Geese's The King of Fighters tournaments, Billy and Geese are defeated by Terry Bogard and his friends, who sought revenge for the death of his father. As such, Geese starts losing control from Southtown and Billy seeks to defeat Terry. Besides the Fatal Fury series, Billy is also a recurring character from the series The King of Fighters in which he continues entering into The King of Fighters tournaments but in a team composed of three members.

He additionally stars in the animated films and comic adaptations from the Fatal Fury and The King of Fighters series. Billy's character has been well-received within video gamers, having appeared in several popularity polls from the series. Additionally, his appearance in The King of Fighters '97 was done as a result of a popularity poll developed by three video game journals. Video game publications have praised Billy as one of the best characters from the Fatal Fury series and liked how he was developed through The King of Fighters.

Character design
In all of the games he appears, Billy is blonde and covers his hair with a red and white bandana. However, he constantly changes his outfit in various games. In the first Fatal Fury game, The King of Fighters '95, and The King of Fighters XIII, Billy sports brown shoes, with blue jean overalls and black fingerless gloves. In Fatal Fury 2 and Fatal Fury Special, Billy sports a tank top with a Union Jack in the top. He also wears light blue jeans, blue fingerless gloves and red boots. In the Real Bout Fatal Fury series and most The King of Fighters games Billy wears a dark blue opened leather jacket, dark blue jeans held with a brown leather belt and brown boots. In Fatal Fury: Wild Ambition and The King of Fighters 2003, he wears a similar outfit from the Real Bout Fatal Fury series but with a black and yellow opened leather jacket, wristbands, black jeans and black boots. In both Wild Ambition and KOF: Maximum Impact 2, Billy has an alternate costume similar to a formal suit with a necktie and gloves. In The King of Fighters XIV, Billy wears an entirely new outfit consisting of a dark blue leather jacket with a red t-shirt saying "Know Your Enemy" underneath, alongside matching pants and black boots. His bandana has an inverted union jack design with his old white and red bandanna wrapping his right pant leg. He now wears black gloves to go with this outfit, possibly to keep his hands cool from the flames made by his staff.

Attributes
Billy's criminal career is motivated more by a desire to make easy money and his respect for Geese Howard than actual malice. He hails from England, he loves heavy metal and plays the guitar very well. His softer side is often shown when he's with his sister Lilly or friend Blue Mary. Billy is violently anti-smoking and hates cigarettes and will assault anyone who blows cigarette smoke in his face (this is the explanation for the 'no smoking' sign on the back of his jacket). While his hatred of Terry Bogard seems to have been softened, Billy has a deep hatred for Iori Yagami, who once beat both Billy and Eiji Kisaragi to near death then abandoned them. He is also not accepting of Joe Higashi dating his sister which is also comically shown in the gallery from The King of Fighters '98.

Billy's polestaff is actually composed of three sections of hard tubing held together by short lengths of chain. When Billy attacks normally the staff remains whole, which would mean that the tension of said springs is quite tight to be able to split them in certain moves and doing so would require a great deal of strength and skill.

Appearances

In video games
Billy is introduced in Fatal Fury as the righthand man of Geese Howard, a crime lord in the fictitious American city of Southtown. Geese holds The King of Fighters tournament every year with Billy as his champion. Billy was the undefeated champion of the tournament, until he is defeated by Terry Bogard, who moved on to later defeat Geese. He also appears in Fatal Fury Special as a playable character for the first time. After Geese recovers, Billy appears in Real Bout Fatal Fury to assist him in the conquer of Southtown. However, Geese is ultimately killed by Terry, causing Billy to leave Southtown. He later appears in the two following games from the series Real Bout Fatal Fury Special and Real Bout Fatal Fury 2: The Newcomers which do not contain a storyline. In the PlayStation version from Real Bout Fatal Fury Special, Billy is brainwashed by his half-brother White in order to aid him in the conquer from Southtown. He then appears as a sub-boss character in the arcade mode, but once he is defeated, he returns to normal. A 3D fighting game version of the series, Fatal Fury: Wild Ambition was produced as well, which retells the plot of the first game.

In The King of Fighters series, Billy was meant to appear in the first game from the series as a member of an England Team, composed of him, Mai Shiranui, and Big Bear, but due to several problems with the capacity of the game, and the desire from the Art of Fighting staff to add Yuri Sakazaki, Billy was removed from the game. When the new King of Fighters tournament began in The King of Fighters '95 under the control of a man named Rugal Bernstein, Billy is ordered by Geese to go in his boss' place because Geese was still healing. He joins with a ninja named Eiji Kisaragi and a mysterious man named Iori Yagami. Billy's team does not win, and at the end of the tournament Iori beats up Billy and Eiji. In The King of Fighters '97 Geese sends Billy to investigate the mysterious Orochi power in Iori. Geese hires a sadistic outlaw named Ryuji Yamazaki and tricks a good freelance agent named Blue Mary to help as well. After the tournament ends, Yamazaki demands his pay from Geese by attacking him and Billy. The same team is shown in The King of Fighters '98, The King of Fighters 2002 and Neowave but none of those contain a storyline. He also appears as an assistant character (known as "Striker") in The King of Fighters '99: Evolution and The King of Fighters 2000. In the former he is available for any character, while in the latter he is a striker for Andy Bogard.

In The King of Fighters 2003, Geese orders the team of Billy Kane, Ryuji Yamazaki, and Gato to infiltrate the tournament in another attempt to take over Southtown. During the spin-off game The King of Fighters Kyo Billy appears as boss character along Geese to fight against the Bogard brothers and the protagonist Kyo Kusanagi. In KOF: Maximum Impact 2, it is revealed Billy has moved to the countryside of the UK with his young sister, Lilly Kane, and has decided to return to Southtown once again, willing to show the Meira twins: Alba and Soiree the town should be embarked by no one.

Billy also appeared in the console version of The King of Fighters XIII, released in November 2011. He is also present in the otome game King of Fighters for Girls.

In other media 
Billy Kane appears in the TV anime film Fatal Fury: Legend of the Hungry Wolf, where he is voiced by Daiki Nakamura in the original Japanese version and Paul Dobson in the English dubbed version. Like in the original Fatal Fury video game, Billy Kane is one of Geese Howard's underlings alongside Raiden, Ripper and Hopper. He enters the King of Fighters tournament alongside Raiden on Geese's behalf and later mortally wounds Tung Fu Rue while the Bogards and Joe are escaping from Geese's men. In the final battle of the film, he ends up fighting against Andy Bogard and ends up being defeated by him. He appears again in the sequel Fatal Fury 2: The New Battle, where he makes an unvoiced appearance in the beginning of the film, in which he is confronted by Laurence Blood at the Pao-Pao Cafe and is defeated off-screen. Billy makes an extended cameo appearance in the third film, Fatal Fury: The Motion Picture, this time voiced by Tomohiro Nishimura in the original Japanese version and once again by Paul Dobson in English. He encounters his old adversary Andy in a night club, but the two are confronted by Laocorn's henchman Hauer before they get a chance to fight again.

In the second episode of the anime spin-off mini-series The King of Fighters: Another Day, Rock Howard, Geese's son, stops Billy from killing Lien Neville who was carrying out a hit on him. Billy tries to convince Rock to help him, because as he carries Geese's heritage, Lien would try to take him out too. Instead, Rock decides to save Lien's life and fights Billy, who almost manages to kill him as well for shaming Geese's legacy, but is blown away by a beam fired over Geese Tower. He also stars in manhua from the video games which retells his actions from the games. Additionally, in the manga The King of Fighters: Kyo authored by Masato Natsumoto, Billy starts investigating Kyo Kusanagi in order to make him talk about the ancient demon Orochi.

Reception
Billy's character has been well received by gamers as he has appeared in several popularity polls developed by video games journals. In Gamest's 1997 Heroes Collection, Billy was voted as the staff's fourth favorite character. In the character popularity poll on Neo Geo Freak's website, he was voted as the seventeenth favorite character with a total of 757 votes. For the special endings in The King of Fighters '97, three video games journals, Gamest, Famitsu and Neo Geo Freak, had to create a team composed of three characters from the game so that they would be featured in an image after passing the arcade mode. The special team created by the Neo Geo Freak's staff was a team of fire wielders: Billy, Kyo Kusanagi, and Mai Shiranui. The special ending only appears in Japanese versions of the game.

His character also received comments from video games reviewers, who added praise and criticism. Avi Krebs from GamingExcellence.com commented that Billy Kane is one of the hardest boss characters from the first Fatal Fury, but he remains "pale" in comparison to the final boss, Geese Howard. Gamezone reviewer Nick Valentino noted him to be one of the most recognizable characters from the Fatal Fury series, describing him as "staff-wielding maniac". Additionally, Billy was found to be one of the best new characters from KOF: Maximum Impact 2 by Greg Kasavin from GameSpot, who also labelled him as "stick fighter". 1UP.com agreed on this, noting it to be great news and labelling Billy to be "King of Fighters first weapon-wielding character". In another article, the 1UP.com staff noted his winpose against Iori Yagami in The King of Fighters 2002 as the best one from the game, liking that he and Eiji Kisaragi (who makes a cameo in the scene) finally take their revenge.

References

Fatal Fury characters
Fictional bodyguards in video games
Fictional criminals in video games
Fictional bojutsuka
Fictional British people in video games
Fictional English people
Fictional gangsters
Fictional henchmen in video games
Fictional martial artists in video games
Fictional stick-fighters
Male characters in video games
Male video game villains
The King of Fighters characters
Video game bosses
Video game characters introduced in 1991